"Fooled Around and Fell in Love" is a song written and performed by blues guitarist Elvin Bishop with Mickey Thomas on lead vocals. It appeared on his 1975 album, Struttin' My Stuff, and was released as a single the following year.

Background
Bishop does not sing lead vocals on the track. He felt that his gravelly voice would not do the song justice; he invited vocalist Mickey Thomas, who was a background singer in his band at the time, to sing it. It peaked at #3 on the Billboard Hot 100 singles chart in May 1976.  The record was certified gold by the Recording Industry Association of America on June 23, 1976.  In Canada, the song reached #22 on the singles chart and #8 on the Adult Contemporary chart. The single reached #3 in the New Zealand Singles Chart.

Based on his work with Bishop, Thomas was invited to become the lead singer for Jefferson Starship (which would later evolve into simply Starship).

In popular culture 

The song is featured in the films Queens Logic (1991), Illtown (1996), Boogie Nights (1997), Summer of Sam (1999), Big Daddy (1999), According to Spencer (2001), The Devil's Rejects (2005), The Family Stone (2005), Invincible (2006), The Education of Charlie Banks (2007), Harold & Kumar Escape from Guantanamo Bay (2008), Stand Up Guys (2012), Lovelace (2013), Guardians of the Galaxy (2014) and Handsome: A Netflix Mystery Movie (2017).

Style
In their 1990 essay "Rock and Sexuality", Simon Frith and Angela McRobbie offer the song as one which "lyrically captures" their idea of an essential distinction in rock music between "cock rock" and "teeny bop".

Personnel 
 Mickey Thomas: lead and backing vocals
 Elvin Bishop: lead guitar
 Johnny 'V' Vernazza: Lead and rhythm guitar, dueling guitar leads with Elvin, backing vocals. 
 Philip Aaberg: piano
 Mike Keck: organ
 Donny Baldwin: drums, percussion
 Michael Brooks: bass
 Bill Szymczyk: producer
 Reni Slais: backing vocals

Chart performance

Weekly charts
Elvin Bishop

Julian Laxton Band

Year-end charts

Cover versions
In 1978, the Julian Laxton Band from South Africa reached #13 there.
In 1985, T. G. Sheppard had a #21 country hit with a cover. A music video was also produced and has aired on CMT, TNN and GAC.
In 2019, Miranda Lambert released a track featuring her Roadside Bars & Pink Guitars Tour support acts Maren Morris, Ashley McBryde, Tenille Townes, Elle King and Caylee Hammack. It won the Academy of Country Music Award for Vocal Event of the Year and was nominated for the Country Music Association Award for Musical Event of the Year.
Rod Stewart released his Still the Same... Great Rock Classics of Our Time album in 2006 which contains his rendition of the song.

References

External links
 

1975 songs
1976 singles
1985 singles
T. G. Sheppard songs
Columbia Records singles
Capricorn Records singles
Song recordings produced by Bill Szymczyk